The St. Andrews Knights are the athletic teams that represent St. Andrews University, located in Laurinburg, North Carolina, in intercollegiate sports a member of the National Association of Intercollegiate Athletics (NAIA), primarily competing in the Appalachian Athletic Conference (AAC) since the 2012–13 academic year; while its swimming and wrestling teams compete in the Mid-South Conference (MSC). Prior returning back to the NAIA, The Knights formerly competed in the Conference Carolinas (CC) of the Division II ranks of the National Collegiate Athletic Association (NCAA) from 1988–89 to 2011–12. The university transitioned to the NAIA after 23 years in the NCAA at the end of the 2011–12 academic year.

Varsity sports
St. Andrews competes in 25 intercollegiate varsity sports: Men's sports include baseball, basketball, cross country, football, golf, lacrosse, soccer, swimming, track & field, volleyball and wrestling; while women's sports include basketball, beach volleyball, cross country, golf, lacrosse, soccer, softball, swimming, track & field, volleyball and wrestling; and co-ed sports include competitive cheer, competitive dance and eSports.

Equestrian
In addition to the 19 NAIA sports, St. Andrews sponsors an extensive equestrian program. The St. Andrews Equestrian Team has won American National Riding Commission (ANRC) national champions in 1996, 1997, 2000, 2001, 2002, and 2007; in addition the Knights finished Reserve Champion at the ANRC Intercollegiate National Championships in 2004 and 2006. The program won two Intercollegiate Horse Show Association (IHSA) Zone Hunter Seat All-Star Championships in 2002 and 2004; six IHSA Hunter Seat Reserve Regional Team Championships in 2002, 2003, 2004, 2005, 2006, and 2007; six IHSA Western Regional Team Championships in 2006, 2007, 2008, 2009, 2010, and 2011; and qualified for the Intercollegiate Dressage Association (IDA) National Final eight times (2002, 2003, 2004, 2005, 2007, 2009, and 2010).

References

External links
 

College sports teams in the United States by team
Appalachian Athletic Conference teams
National Association of Intercollegiate Athletics teams
Equestrian educational establishments
Equestrian sports in the United States
College sports teams in North Carolina